The Eskimo Baby (German:Das Eskimobaby) is a 1918 German silent comedy film directed by Heinz Schall and starring Asta Nielsen.

Cast
 Asta Nielsen as Eskimo Ivigtut  
 Freddy Wingardh as Knud Prätorius

References

Bibliography
 Annette Kuhn. The Women's Companion to International Film. University of California Press, 1990.

External links

1918 films
Films of the German Empire
Films directed by Heinz Schall
German silent feature films
German black-and-white films
1918 comedy films
German comedy films
Silent comedy films
1910s German films
1910s German-language films